Sangaris is a genus of longhorn beetles of the subfamily Lamiinae.

 Sangaris albida Monné, 1993
 Sangaris cancellata (Bates, 1881)
 Sangaris concinna Dalman, 1823
 Sangaris condei Melzer, 1931
 Sangaris duplex (Bates, 1881)
 Sangaris geometrica (Bates, 1872)
 Sangaris giesberti Hovore, 1998
 Sangaris inornata Monné, 1993
 Sangaris invida Melzer, 1932
 Sangaris laeta (Bates, 1881)
 Sangaris lezamai Hovore, 1998
 Sangaris luctuosa (Pascoe, 1859)
 Sangaris luteonotata Monné & Monné, 2009
 Sangaris multimaculata Hovore, 1998
 Sangaris obtusicarinata (Zajciw, 1962)
 Sangaris octomaculata Aurivillius, 1902
 Sangaris optata (Pascoe, 1866)
 Sangaris ordinale Monné & Monné, 2009
 Sangaris penrosei Hovore, 1998
 Sangaris polystigma (Bates, 1881)
 Sangaris seabrai Zajciw, 1962
 Sangaris sexmaculata Monné, 1993
 Sangaris spilota Martins & Galileo, 2009
 Sangaris trifasciata Melzer, 1928
 Sangaris viridipennis Melzer, 1931
 Sangaris zikani Melzer, 1931

References

 
Colobotheini